Aliabad-e Herati (also Romanized as ‘Alīābād-e Herātī and ‘Alīābād-e Harātī; also known as ‘Alīābād) is a village in Ferdows Rural District, Ferdows District, Rafsanjan County, Kerman Province, Iran. At the 2006 census, its population was 196, in 49 families.

References 

Populated places in Rafsanjan County